Gerze is a town and a district of Sinop Province in the Black Sea region of Turkey. It is 49 km east of Sinop and 140 km west of Samsun. It was first settled by the Ionians and was known as Carusa. In 2012, the region was subjected to protests and controversy around the proposed construction of a coal power plant, a project that was later withdrawn by the government after a negative environmental impact assessment.

Region
The Çeçe Sultan Tomb, a pilgrimage place, is 15 km from the town. The date of its construction is unknown. The region is noted for its traditional domestic architecture. The regions of Değirmenler and İdemli, and Gazhane Bay are popular excursion places.

References

External links

Populated places in Sinop Province
Black Sea port cities and towns in Turkey
Fishing communities in Turkey
Populated coastal places in Turkey
Gerze District
Districts of Sinop Province
Cittaslow